John Francis O'Ryan (August 21, 1874 - January 29, 1961) was a Manhattan, New York City attorney, politician, government official and military officer.  He served as commander of the 27th Division during World War I.  He later served as a member of the New York State Transit Commission and as New York City Police Commissioner.  During World War II he was New York State Civil Defense Director.

Early career

O'Ryan was born in New York City on August 21, 1874. He had a sister named Anna Wynne O'Ryan who was a librettist. He attended the public schools of New York City, City College of New York and the law program of New York University, and became an attorney in 1898.  He enlisted in the New York National Guard while still a college student and received his commission as a Second Lieutenant in 1900.

In 1912 O'Ryan was appointed Major General and commander of the New York National Guard.  He graduated from the Army War College in 1914 and served in the 1916 Villa Expedition.

In 1914 O'Ryan received his law degree from New York University School of Law as a member of the class of 1896.

World War I

At the start of World War I the New York National Guard was organized as the 27th Division with O'Ryan as commander and Stanley H. Ford as its chief of staff in 1918.  The 27th saw action in Belgium and France, and O'Ryan, the Army's youngest division commander when he arrived in Europe, was the only National Guard general to remain in command throughout the war.  After returning to the United States O'Ryan was a founder of the American Legion.

Post-World War I
From 1922 to 1926 he was a member of the New York State Transit Commission.  In 1926 he became prominent in the development of commercial aviation as a partner in Pan American Airways, later becoming President of Colonial Airlines.

In 1933 O'Ryan led parades protesting the treatment of Jews in Germany and advocating for the U.S. government to intervene on their behalf.

In 1934 he was a Republican candidate for Mayor of New York, but withdrew in favor of Fiorello LaGuardia.  When LaGuardia won, O'Ryan accepted appointment as his Police Commissioner.  O'Ryan served for most of 1935 before resigning over disagreement with LaGuardia's non-intervention stance on labor-management disputes.

World War II
In 1940 O'Ryan led a study group in Japan and occupied China, with the knowledge of President Franklin D. Roosevelt.  The committee, which included economists Warren S. Hunsberger and Simon N. Whitney, were invited by the Japanese Economic Federation and the New York investment firm of Eastman Dillon and Company to research ways to improve trade relations between Japan and the U.S. so that Japan might become a U.S. ally.  While in Japan, O'Ryan learned that the Japanese government planned to sign the Tripartite Pact with Fascist Italy and Nazi Germany.  O'Ryan and his group submitted their report to the Japanese Economic Federation and returned home.

During the war he served as New York State's Civil Defense Director and was also an unofficial advisor to Secretary of War Henry L. Stimson.  In 1945 he was elected National Commander of the Military Order of Foreign Wars and, on December 7, 1945, visited President Truman at the White House to pay his respects.

Awards
O'Ryan's awards included the Distinguished Service Medal and the Victory Medal. The citation to his Army DSM reads:

In addition to these, he also received the following foreign decorations: British Order of St. Michael and St. George (Knight Commander); British Royal Victorian Order (Commander); French Legion of Honor (Commander); French Croix de Guerre with Palm; Belgian Order of Leopold (Commander); Belgian Croix de Guerre with Palm; and Italian Order of Saints Maurice and Lazarus.

In 1919 O'Ryan received an honorary Doctor of Laws (LL.D.) from New York University.

Death and burial
General O'Ryan died in South Salem, New York on January 29, 1961.  He was buried at Arlington National Cemetery, Section 2, Site E-17 LH.

Legacy
In 1952 a New York National Guard training area in Wethersfield, New York was dedicated in his honor, Camp O'Ryan.  It had been used as a training site beginning in 1949, and remained in use until 1974.  It was returned to use in 1989, and was inactivated in 1994.

Bibliography

References

External links

Oryan Roughnecks
Digger History
ARMY COURT DEALS SWIFT PUNISHMENT - July 22, 1916
O'Ryan, World War General, Registers as Japanese Agent; The Washington Post; July 16, 1940
O'Ryan Japanese Economic Mission History
More on history of O'Ryan Japanese Economic Mission
O'RYAN OFF FOR JAPAN ON ECONOMIC MISSION; General Heads Committee to Spur Trade Relations, New York Times, June 10, 1940
Gen. O'Ryan Dead; Headed the 27th, New York Times, Jan 31, 1961 article
 

1874 births
1961 deaths
Burials at Arlington National Cemetery
Commandeurs of the Légion d'honneur
Honorary Knights Commander of the Order of St Michael and St George
Lawyers from New York City
Military personnel from New York City
National Guard (United States) generals
New York City Police Commissioners
New York (state) lawyers
New York (state) Republicans
New York University School of Law alumni
Organization founders
People from South Salem, New York
Recipients of the Croix de Guerre 1914–1918 (France)
Recipients of the Croix de guerre (Belgium)
Recipients of the Distinguished Service Medal (US Army)
Recipients of the Order of Saints Maurice and Lazarus
United States Army generals of World War I
United States Army generals of World War II
United States Army War College alumni
United States Army generals